Røiseland is a Norwegian surname. Notable people with the surname include:

Bent Røiseland (1902–1981), Norwegian politician 
Marte Olsbu Røiseland (born 1990), Norwegian biathlete

Norwegian-language surnames